Eucereon atriguttum is a moth of the subfamily Arctiinae. It was described by Herbert Druce in 1905. It is found in Venezuela and Honduras.

References

 

atriguttum
Moths described in 1905